The 1916–1921 Club was founded in the 1940s. The motivation for the Club was to heal the divisions created by the Irish Civil War. Protagonists from both sides were invited to join. The Association of the Old Dublin Brigade, Óglaigh na hÉireann was also open to the surviving members of the War of Independence. The Club incorporated the Association in the early 1980s as their membership declined.

Membership of the Club is open to all Irish citizens who subscribe to the objectives and accept the documents upon which it bases its objectives. Past Presidents have included Captain James Kelly, Sean O’Mahony, Ernest Cowan, James Fanning, Jim Doyle, Nora Comiskey, Maire Ui Nuallain, General Michael J Costello and many veterans of the war of independence including Commandant Sean Sheridan and Commandant Vincent Byrne.

Objectives

To honour and remember the dead who fought for Irish Freedom and all those who worked its achievement.
To cultivate in our time the spirit of Nationality and Unity that marked the 1916-1921 periods.
To contribute to the cause of an Ireland — united, independent and sovereign.
To work for the reconciliation of all Irish people in the context of a united nation, in the belief that it is only such a united people who can effect a lasting and real peace with the British.
To promote Irish traditions and cultures.

Society Charter

1. The Proclamation of Easter 1916.
2. The Declaration of Independence, enacted by Dáil Éireann in 1919.
3. The Constitution of Ireland (Bunreacht na hÉireann) enacted by the Irish people in 1937. 
4. The Republic of Ireland Act 1948, enacted by the Oireachtas.
5. The Declaration of Dáil Éireann unanimously adopted in May 1949.

Publications
Death in the Castle: Three murders in Dublin Castle 1920. Publisher: 1916/1921 Club (this publication records both the life and deaths of Dick McKee, Peadar Clancy and Conor Clune)
The First Hunger Striker: Thomas Ashe 1917 Sean O Mahony. Publisher: 1916/1921 Club

References

External links
A lecture organised by the Club
The Irish War of Independence By Michael Hopkinson
Green against Green The Irish Civil War, Michael Hopkinson

History of Ireland (1801–1923)
Irish Republican Army (1919–1922) members
Members of the Irish Republican Brotherhood
Irish revolutionaries